Video Gag (pronounced vee-day-oh gag) is a French television series that airs weekly on French broadcast channel TF1. It is essentially a French version of "America's Funniest Home Videos" or the British "You've been framed!" and uses hilarious videos sent in by viewers. Although the videos are primarily French in origin, it also uses other videos from other countries on occasion.

Videos Gag has two hosts: Sebastien Follin, (who as of 2005 also gives the weather on the TF1 news) and Olivia Adriaco, a famous French model and TV personality. Previously, it was hosted by Bernard Montiel and Alexandre Debanne.

French comedy television series